The Central Unified School District is a school district in Fresno County, California.

List of schools

Here is a list of all the schools in the Central Unified School District:

Elementary schools 

Biola-Pershing Elementary School
Harvest Elementary School
Herndon-Barstow Elementary School
[[Houghton-Kearney Middle School
Liddell Elementary School
Polk Elementary School
Madison Elementary
McKinley Elementary School, Santa Barbara, California|McKinley Elementary School
River Bluff Elementary School
Roosevelt Elementary School (Fresno, California)|Roosevelt Elementary School
Saroyan Elementary School
Steinbeck Elementary School
Teague Elementary School
Tilley Elementary School

Middle
El Capitan Middle School
Glacier Point School
Rio Vista Middle School

High schools 
Central High School (East Campus)
Central High School (West Campus)
Pershing Continuation High School
Pathway Community Day School
North west High school
Justin Garza High School

Adult education 

Central Adult School (CLASS)

See also
List of school districts in Fresno County, California

References

External links
http://centralunified.org/

School districts in Fresno County, California